Loving You Is Easy may refer to:

 "Lovin' You Is So Easy", 1972 song by The Temprees from Dedicated to the One I Love
 "Loving You Is Easy", 1984 song by Tracey Ullman, composed by Doug Taylor, from You Caught Me Out
 "Loving You Is Easy", 2004 song by The Charlatans from Up at the Lake
 "Loving You Is Easy", 2010 song by Sarah McLachlan from Laws of Illusion
 "Loving You Is Easy", 2010 song by Chris August from No Far Away, and Ben Rector from Into the Morning
 "Loving You Is Easy", 2011 song by Marié Digby from Your Love
 "Loving You Is Easy", 2013 song by Union J from Union J
 "Loving You Is Easy", 2013 song by Austin Mahone from Extended Play
 "Loving You Is Easy", 2013 song by Camo & Krooked

See also
Loving You (disambiguation)